This is a list of notable awards won by Sesame Street, an American children's television series which has achieved worldwide recognition. Created by the non-profit Children's Television Workshop (now Sesame Workshop), and first aired in 1969, the series has been regularly acknowledged for its innovative teaching techniques.

Emmy Awards

Note that 1988 "Outstanding Children's Program" nominee A Muppet Family Christmas included Sesame Street characters.

Daytime Emmy Awards

1976
 Won - Outstanding Individual Achievement in Any Area of Creative Technical Crafts (Don Sahlin, Kermit Love, Caroly Wilcox, John Lovelady, Rollin Krewson, costumes and props for the Muppets)
 Won - Outstanding Individual Achievement in Children's Programming (Jim Henson, Frank Oz, Jerry Nelson, Caroll Spinney, Richard Hunt), performers) 
Nominated - Outstanding Children's Instructional Programming - Series and Specials
 Nominated - Outstanding Individual Achievement in Children's Programming (Gerri Brioso, graphic designer)

1977
 Won - Outstanding Children's Instructional Programming - Series and Specials

1978
 Nominated - Outstanding Children's Instructional Series

1979
 Won - Outstanding Individual Achievement in Children's Programming (Jim Henson, Frank Oz, Caroll Spinney, Jerry Nelson, Richard Hunt, performers) 
 Won - Outstanding Individual Achievement in Children's Programming (Dick Maitland, Roy Carch, sound effects) 
 Nominated - Outstanding Children's Instructional Series

1980
 Won - Outstanding Children's Informational/Instructional Series/Specials
 Won - Outstanding Individual Achievement in Children's Programming (Steve Zink, director of photography)
 Nominated - Outstanding Individual Achievement in Children's Programming (Tony Di Girolamo, lighting director)

1981
 Won - Outstanding Achievement in Children's Programming - Lighting Direction
 Won - Outstanding Individual Achievement in Children's Programming - Audio
 Won - Special Classification of Outstanding Individual Achievement - Puppet Design, Construction and Costuming
 Nominated - Outstanding Achievement in Children's Programming - Graphics and Animation Design
 Nominated - Outstanding Children's Informational/Instructional Series
 Nominated - Outstanding Individual Achievement in Children's Programming - Writers

1982
 Nominated - Outstanding Children's Informational/Instructional Series
 Nominated - Outstanding Individual Achievement in Children's Programming - Lighting Director
 Nominated - Outstanding Music Composition/Direction in Children's Programming
 Nominated - Outstanding Writing for Children's Programming

1983
 Won - Outstanding Children's Informational/Instructional Series
 Won - Outstanding Individual Achievement in Children's Programming - Art Direction/Scenic Design/Set Decoration
 Won - Outstanding Individual Achievement in Children's Programming - Graphic Design
 Nominated - Outstanding Individual Achievement in Children's Programming - Lighting Direction (William C. Knight)
 Nominated - Outstanding Individual Achievement in Children's Programming - Lighting Direction (Randy Nordstrom)
 Nominated - Outstanding Individual Achievement in Children's Programming - Writing
 Nominated - Outstanding Individual Direction in Children's Programming
 Nominated - Outstanding Music Composition/Direction in Children's Programming

1984
 Won - Outstanding Individual Achievement in Children's Programming - Lighting Direction
 Won - Outstanding Individual Achievement in Technical Crafts in Children's Programming - Audio
 Won - Outstanding Individual Achievement in Technical Crafts in Children's Programming - Technical Direction
 Won - Outstanding Writing in Children's Programming
 Won - Special Classification of Outstanding Individual Achievement - Performers (Caroll Spinney)
 Nominated - Outstanding Children's Informational/Instructional Series
 Nominated - Outstanding Individual Achievement in Technical Crafts in Children's Programming - Associate Direction/Videotape Editing

1985
 Won - Outstanding Achievement in Video Tape Editing
 Won - Outstanding Children's Series
 Nominated - Outstanding Directing in Children's Programming
 Nominated - Outstanding Writing in a Children's Series

1986
 Won - Outstanding Achievement in Art Direction/Set Direction/Scenic Design
 Won - Outstanding Achievement in Costume Design
 Won - Outstanding Children's Series
 Won - Outstanding Writing in a Children's Series
 Nominated - Outstanding Achievement in Lighting Direction
 Nominated - Outstanding Achievement in Live and Tape Sound Mixing and Sound Effects
 Nominated - Outstanding Achievement in Videotape Editing
 Nominated - Outstanding Individual Achievement in Children's Programming - Directing (Lisa Simon)
 Nominated - Outstanding Individual Achievement in Children's Programming - Directing (Emily Squires)
 Nominated - Outstanding Individual Achievement in Children's Programming - Directing (Jon Stone)

1987
 Won - Outstanding Children's Series
 Won - Outstanding Writing in a Children's Series
 Nominated - Outstanding Achievement in Costume Design
 Nominated - Outstanding Achievement in Lighting Direction
 Nominated - Outstanding Directing in Children's Programming

1988
 Won - Outstanding Live and Tape Sound Mixing and Sound Effects
 Won - Outstanding Writing in a Children's Series
 Won - Outstanding Children's Series
 Nominated - Outstanding Achievement in Art Direction/Set Direction/Scenic Design
 Nominated - Outstanding Achievement in Costume Design
 Nominated - Outstanding Achievement in Videotape Editing

1989
 Won - Outstanding Music Direction and Composition
 Won - Outstanding Writing in a Children's Series
 Nominated - Outstanding Achievement in Art Direction/Set Direction/Scenic Design
 Nominated - Outstanding Achievement in Costume Design
 Nominated - Outstanding Achievement in Lighting Direction
 Nominated - Outstanding Children's Series
 Nominated - Outstanding Performer in a Children's Series (Sonia Manzano)

1990
 Won - Outstanding Achievement in Art Direction/Set Decoration/Scenic Design
 Won - Outstanding Achievement in Costume Design
 Won - Outstanding Achievement in Lighting Direction
 Won - Outstanding Achievement in Music Direction and Composition
 Won - Outstanding Achievement in Videotape Editing
 Won - Outstanding Performer in a Children's Series (Kevin Clash)
 Won - Outstanding Writing in a Children's Series

1991
 Won - Outstanding Achievement in Lighting Direction
 Won - Outstanding Children's Series
 Won - Outstanding Writing in a Children's Series

1992
 Won - Outstanding Children's Series
 Won - Outstanding Live and Tape Sound Mixing and Sound Effects
 Won - Outstanding Multiple Camera Editing
 Won - Outstanding Writing in a Children's Series
 Nominated - Outstanding Performer in a Children's Series (Sonia Manzano)

1993
 Won - Outstanding Art Direction/Set Decoration/Scenic Design
 Nominated - Outstanding Performer in a Children's Series (Jerry Nelson)

1994
 Won - Outstanding Costume Design
 Won - Outstanding Lighting Direction
 Won - Outstanding Children's Series
 Won - Outstanding Writing in a Children's Series
 Won - Outstanding Multiple Camera Editing
 Won - Outstanding Technical Direction/Electronic Camera/Video Control
 Won - Outstanding Art Direction/Set Decoration/Scenic Design
 Nominated - Outstanding Performer in a Children's Series (Ruth Buzzi)

1995
 Won - Outstanding Directing in a Children's Series
 Won - Outstanding Pre-School Children's Series
 Won - Outstanding Writing in a Children's Series
 Won - Outstanding Multiple Camera Editing
 Nominated - Outstanding Performer in a Children's Series (Martin P. Robinson)

1996
 Won - Outstanding Multiple Camera Editing
 Won - Outstanding Pre-School Children's Series
 Nominated - Outstanding Achievement in Lighting Direction
 Nominated - Outstanding Achievement in Makeup
 Nominated - Outstanding Achievement in Music Direction and Composition
 Nominated - Outstanding Art Direction/Set Direction/Scenic Design
 Nominated - Outstanding Costume Design or Costuming
 Nominated - Outstanding Directing in a Children's Series
 Nominated - Outstanding Hairstyling
 Nominated - Outstanding Writing in a Children's Series

1997
 Won - Outstanding Pre-School Children's Series
 Nominated - Outstanding Achievement in Costume Design/Styling
 Won - Outstanding Children's Special - (Elmo Saves Christmas)
 Won - Outstanding Costume Design/Styling - (Elmo Saves Christmas)
 Nominated - Outstanding Achievement in Sound Mixing - Special Class
 Nominated - Outstanding Art Direction/Set Direction/Scenic Design
 Nominated - Outstanding Directing in a Children's Series
 Nominated - Outstanding Hairstyling
 Nominated - Outstanding Music Direction and Composition
 Nominated - Outstanding Original Song
 Nominated - Outstanding Performer in a Children's Series (Kevin Clash)
 Nominated - Outstanding Writing in a Children's Series

1998
 Won - Outstanding Achievement in Sound Mixing - Special Class
 Won - Outstanding Directing in a Children's Series
 Won - Outstanding Pre-School Series
 Won - Outstanding Writing in a Children's Series
 Nominated - Outstanding Achievement in Art Direction/Set Direction/Scenic Design
 Nominated - Outstanding Achievement in Hairstyling
 Nominated - Outstanding Achievement in Technical Direction/Electronic Camera/Video Control
 Nominated - Outstanding Costume Design/Styling
 Nominated - Outstanding Performer in a Children's Series (Caroll Spinney)

1999
 Won - Outstanding Costume Design/Styling
 Won - Outstanding Multiple Camera Editing
 Won - Outstanding Pre-School Children's Series
 Won - Outstanding Writing in a Children's Series
 Nominated - Outstanding Art Direction/Set Decoration/Scenic Design
 Nominated - Outstanding Directing in a Children's Series
 Nominated - Outstanding Music Direction and Composition
 Nominated - Outstanding Performer in a Children's Series (Kevin Clash)
 Nominated - Outstanding Performer in a Children's Series (Caroll Spinney)
 Nominated - Outstanding Sound Editing
 Nominated - Outstanding Sound Mixing

2000
 Won - Outstanding Pre-School Children's Series
 Nominated - Outstanding Achievement in Art Direction/Set) 
 Nominated - Outstanding Achievement in Costume Design/Styling
 Nominated - Outstanding Achievement in Hairstyling
 Nominated - Outstanding Achievement in Lighting Direction
 Nominated - Outstanding Achievement in Makeup
 Nominated - Outstanding Achievement in Multiple Camera Editing
 Nominated - Outstanding Achievement in Music Direction and Composition
 Nominated - Outstanding Achievement in Sound 
 Nominated - Outstanding Achievement in Sound Mixing 
 Nominated - Outstanding Directing in a Children's Series
 Nominated - Outstanding Performer in a Children's Series (Kevin Clash)
 Nominated - Outstanding Writing in a Children's Series

2001
 Won - Outstanding Achievement in Costume Design/Styling
 Won - Outstanding Pre-School Children's Series
 Won - Outstanding Writing in a Children's Series
 Nominated - Outstanding Achievement in Art Direction/Set
 Nominated - Outstanding Achievement in Hairstyling
 Nominated - Outstanding Achievement in Lighting Direction
 Nominated - Outstanding Achievement in Makeup
 Nominated - Outstanding Achievement in Multiple Camera Editing
 Nominated - Outstanding Achievement in Music Direction and Composition
 Nominated - Outstanding Achievement in Sound Mixing
 Nominated - Outstanding Achievement in Technical Direction/Electronic 
 Nominated - Outstanding Directing in a Children's Series
 Nominated - Outstanding Performer in a Children's Series (Kevin Clash)

2002
 Won - Outstanding Achievement in Costume Design/Styling
 Won - Outstanding Achievement in Music Direction and Composition
 Won - Outstanding Achievement in Sound Mixing - Special Class
 Won - Outstanding Directing in a Children's Series
 Won - Outstanding Pre-School Children's Series
 Won - Outstanding Writing in a Children's Series
 Nominated - Outstanding Achievement in Art Direction/Set Decoration/Scenic Design
 Nominated - Outstanding Achievement in Hairstyling
 Nominated - Outstanding Achievement in Lighting Direction
 Nominated - Outstanding Achievement in Multiple Camera Editing
 Nominated - Outstanding Achievement in Technical Direction/Electronic 
 Nominated - Outstanding Performer in a Children's Series (Kevin Clash)

2003
 Won - Outstanding Achievement in Costume Design/Styling
 Won - Outstanding Achievement in Main Title Design
 Won - Outstanding Achievement in Music Direction and Composition
 Won - Outstanding Achievement in Technical Direction/Electronic 
 Won - Outstanding Pre-School Children's Series
 Won - Outstanding Writing in a Children's Series
 Nominated - Outstanding Achievement in Art Direction/Set 
 Nominated - Outstanding Achievement in Makeup
 Nominated - Outstanding Achievement in Multiple Camera Editing
 Nominated - Outstanding Achievement in Sound Mixing - Live Action and Animation
 Nominated - Outstanding Directing in a Children's Series
 Nominated - Outstanding Performer in a Children's Series (Kevin Clash)

2004
 Won - Outstanding Achievement in Costume Design/Styling
 Won - Outstanding Achievement in Lighting Direction
 Won - Outstanding Achievement in Multiple Camera Editing
 Won - Outstanding Achievement in Sound Mixing - Live Action and Animation
 Won - Outstanding Directing in a Children's Series
 Won - Outstanding Pre-School Children's Series
 Nominated - Outstanding Achievement in Art Direction/Set Decoration/Scenic Design
 Nominated - Outstanding Achievement in Music Direction and Composition
 Nominated - Outstanding Performer in a Children's Series (Kevin Clash)
 Nominated - Outstanding Performer in a Children's Series (David Rudman)
 Nominated - Outstanding Writing in a Children's Series

2005
 Won - Outstanding Achievement in Art Direction/Set Decoration/Scenic Design
 Won - Outstanding Directing in a Children's Series
 Won - Outstanding Performer in a Children's Series (Kevin Clash)
 Won - Outstanding Pre-School Children's Series
 Nominated - Outstanding Achievement in Costume Design/Styling
 Nominated - Outstanding Achievement in Multiple Camera Editing
 Nominated - Outstanding Achievement in Lighting Direction
 Nominated - Outstanding Achievement in Music Direction and Composition
 Nominated - Outstanding Original Song: (for "Baby You're So Smart")
 Nominated - Outstanding Original Song: (for "Things Change")
 Nominated - Outstanding Original Song: (for "Who Will Be My Friend?")
 Nominated - Outstanding Achievement in Sound Mixing
 Nominated - Outstanding Writing in a Children's Series

2006
 Won - Outstanding Achievement in Art Direction/Set Decoration/Scenic Design
 Won - Outstanding Achievement in Costume Design/Styling
 Won - Outstanding Achievement in Multiple Camera Editing
 Won - Outstanding Achievement in Music Direction And Composition
 Won - Outstanding Performer In A Children's Series (Kevin Clash)
 Won - Outstanding Pre-School Children's Series
 Won - Outstanding Achievement in Sound Mixing - Live Action and Animation
 Won - Outstanding Writing In A Children's Series
 Nominated - Outstanding Achievement in Lighting Direction
 Nominated - Outstanding Achievement in Technical Direction/Electronic Camera/Video
 Nominated - Outstanding Directing In A Children's Series

2007
 Won - Outstanding Achievement in Costume Design/Styling
 Won - Outstanding Achievement in Multiple Camera Editing
 Won - Outstanding Achievement in Music Direction and Composition
 Won - Outstanding Achievement in Sound Mixing - Live Action and Animation
 Won - Outstanding Directing in a Children's Series
 Won - Outstanding Performer in a Children's Series (Caroll Spinney)
 Won - Outstanding Performer in a Children's Series (Kevin Clash)
 Won - Outstanding Pre-School Children's Series
 Nominated - Outstanding Achievement in Art Direction/Set Decoration/Scenic Design
 Nominated - Outstanding Achievement in Lighting Direction
 Nominated - Outstanding Achievement in Sound Editing - Live Action and Animation
 Nominated - Outstanding Writing in a Children's Series

2008
 Won - Outstanding Pre-School Children's Series
 Nominated - Outstanding Achievement in Costume Design/Styling
 Nominated - Outstanding Achievement in Costume Design/Styling
 Nominated - Outstanding Achievement in Main Title Design
 Nominated - Outstanding Achievement in Makeup
 Nominated - Outstanding Achievement in Multiple Camera Editing
 Nominated - Outstanding Achievement in Sound Mixing - Live Action and Animation
 Nominated - Outstanding Achievement in Technical Direction/Electronic Camera/Video Control
 Nominated - Outstanding Directing in a Children's Series
 Nominated - Outstanding Original Song - Children's and Animation ("Get Up, Get Out!")
 Nominated - Outstanding Original Song - Children's and Animation ("See the Signs")
 Nominated - Outstanding Performer in a Children's Series (Kevin Clash)
 Nominated - Outstanding Writing in a Children's Series

2009
 Won - Outstanding Costume Design/Styling
 Won - Outstanding Directing in a Children's Series
 Won - Outstanding New Approaches - Daytime Children's
 Won - Outstanding Performer in a Children's Series (Kevin Clash)
 Won - Lifetime Achievement Award
 Nominated - Outstanding Achievement in Lighting Direction
 Nominated - Outstanding Achievement in Music Direction and Composition
 Nominated - Outstanding Original Song - Children's and Animation ("I Don't Wanna Be a Prince")
 Nominated - Outstanding Original Song - Children's and Animation ("Elmo's Ducks")
 Nominated - Outstanding Original Song - Children's and Animation ("The Additional Expedition")
 Nominated - Outstanding Performer in a Children's Series (Leslie Carrara)
 Nominated - Outstanding Performer in a Children's Series (Christopher Knowings)
 Nominated - Outstanding Performer in a Children's Series (Martin P. Robinson)
 Nominated - Outstanding Pre-School Children's Series
 Nominated - Outstanding Writing in a Children's Series

2010
 Won - Outstanding Individual in Animation - character designer for Abby's Flying Fairy School
 Won - Outstanding Performer in a Children's Series (Kevin Clash)
 Won - Outstanding Performer in a Children's Series (Joey Mazzarino)
 Won - Outstanding Costume Design/Styling
 Won - Outstanding Directing in a Children's Series
 Won - Outstanding Multiple Camera Editing
 Won - Outstanding Writing in a Children's Series
 Won - Outstanding Pre-School Children's Series

2011
 Won - Outstanding Art Direction/Set Decoration/Scenic Design
 Won - Outstanding Costume Design/Styling
 Won - Outstanding Directing in a Children's Series
 Won - Outstanding Multiple Camera Editing 
 Won - Outstanding Original Song - Children's and Animation - What I Am
 Won - Outstanding Performer in a Children's Series (Kevin Clash)
 Won - Outstanding Pre-School Children's Series
 Won - Outstanding Technical Direction/Electronic Camera/Video Control

2012
 Won - Outstanding Directing in a Children's Series
 Won - Outstanding Multiple Camera Editing
 Won - Outstanding Performer in a Children's Series (Kevin Clash)
 Won - Outstanding Pre-School Children's Series
 Won - Outstanding Sound Editing - Live Action
 Won - Outstanding Sound Mixing - Live Action
 Won - Outstanding Technical Direction/Electronic Camera/Video Control
 Won - Outstanding Writing in a Children's Series

2013
 Won - Outstanding Directing in a Children's Series
 Won - Outstanding Main Title and Graphic Design
 Won - Outstanding Multiple Camera Editing
 Won - Outstanding Performer in a Children's Series (Kevin Clash)
 Won - Outstanding Pre-School Children's Series
 Won - Outstanding Sound Editing - Live Action
 Won - Outstanding Writing in a Children's Series

2014
 Won - Outstanding Directing in a Children's Series
 Won - Outstanding Multiple Camera Editing
 Won - Outstanding Pre-School Children's Series
 Won - Outstanding Sound Editing - Live Action
 Won - Outstanding Sound Mixing - Live Action
 Won - Outstanding Writing in a Children's Series

2015
 Won - Outstanding Costume Design/Styling
 Won - Outstanding Multiple Camera Editing
 Won - Outstanding Original Song - Power of Yet
 Won - Outstanding Sound Editing - Live Action
 Won - Outstanding Writing in a Children's or Pre-School Children's Series

2016
 Won - Outstanding Pre-School Children's Series
 Won - Outstanding Sound Editing - Live Action
 Won - Outstanding Sound Mixing - Live Action

2017
 Won - Outstanding Art Direction/Set Decoration/Scenic Design
 Won - Outstanding Directing in a Children's, Pre-School Children's or Family Viewing Program
 Won - Outstanding Sound Editing - Live Action
 Won - Outstanding Writing in a Children's, Pre-School Children's or Family Viewing Program
 Won - Outstanding Pre-School Children's Series

2018
 Won - Outstanding Original Song - A Song About Songs
 Won - Outstanding Sound Editing - Live Action
 Won - Outstanding Multiple Camera Editing
 Won - Outstanding Technical Team
 Won - Outstanding Art Direction/Set Decoration/Scenic Design
 Won - Outstanding Writing in a Children's, Pre-School Children's or Family Viewing Program
 Won - Outstanding Pre-School Children's Series
 Won -  Outstanding Special Class - Short Format Daytime Program - Twinkle Twinkle Little Star with Julia & Elmo

2019
 Won - Outstanding Sound Mixing
 Won - Outstanding Multiple Camera Editing
 Won - Outstanding Preschool Children’s Series

2020
 Won - Outstanding Technical Team - Sesame Street's 50th Anniversary Celebration
 Won - Outstanding Writing in a Special Class Special - Sesame Street's 50th Anniversary Celebration
 Won - Outstanding Directing in a Children's, Young Adult, or Animated Program
 Won - Outstanding Main Title and Graphic Design for a Lifestyle and Animated Program - Sesame Street's 50th Anniversary Celebration
 Won - Outstanding Multiple Camera Editing - Sesame Street's 50th Anniversary Celebration
 Won - Outstanding Special Effects Costume, Makeup and Hairstyling - Sesame Street
 Won - Outstanding Principal Performance in a Daytime Program (Ryan Dillon) - Sesame Street's 50th Anniversary Celebration
 Won - Outstanding Pre-School Children's Series
 Won - Outstanding Short Form Children's Program - Sesame Street In Communities: Meet Salia
 Won - Outstanding Special Class Special - Sesame Street's 50th Anniversary Celebration
 Nominated - Outstanding Short Form Children's Program - Sesame Street In Communities: A Place For You
 Nominated - Outstanding Daytime Promotional Announcement - Brand Image Campaign - Network or Program - Sesame Street 50th Memories #ThisIsMyStreet Campaign
 Nominated - Outstanding Host for a Daytime Program (Joseph Gordon-Levitt) - Sesame Street's 50th Anniversary Celebration
 Nominated - Outstanding Writing for a Children's or Young Adult Program
 Nominated - Outstanding Lighting Direction
 Nominated - Outstanding Sound Mixing
 Nominated - Outstanding Art Direction/Set Decoration/Scenic Design

2021
 Won - Outstanding Technical Team
 Won - Outstanding Directing for a Preschool, Children's or Family Viewing Program
 Won - Outstanding Writing for a Preschool, Children’s or Family Viewing Program - The Power of We: A Sesame Street Special
 Won - Outstanding Preschool, Children’s or Family Viewing Program - The Power of We: A Sesame Street Special

Children's and Family Emmy Awards

Other

Awards and nominations for international co-productions

Footnotes

References

Academy of Television Arts and Sciences. Award search database.
O'Neil, Thomas. The Emmys. Penguin Books: 1992.

Sesame Street, List of awards won by
Sesame Street